Christal Films (also known as Les Films Christal) is a film distribution company, specializing in Quebec, French and international cinema. Christal Films is a subsidiary of Entertainment One, which is owned by American toy manufacturer Hasbro.

References

Entertainment One
Film distributors of Canada
Companies based in Montreal
Entertainment companies established in 2009
Cinema of Quebec